Lieutenant-General Sir Louis Ridley Vaughan  (7 August 1875 – 7 December 1942), was a British Indian Army staff officer and First World War general. During the First World War, he served on the Western Front, and was chief of staff to General Sir Julian Byng, commander of the Third Army from May 1917 until the end of the war. After the war, he served in the Third Anglo-Afghan War of 1919, and then held several army positions in India until his retirement in 1928. He died in 1942 at the age of 67.

Early life
Louis Ridley Vaughan was born on 7 August 1875. He was the second son of Cedric Vaughan, a Justice of the Peace in Millom, Cumberland, UK. Louis Vaughan was educated at Uppingham School and the Royal Military College at Sandhurst, entering the army in 1895.

Early army career
Vaughan entered the Indian Army in December 1896 and was made captain in 1904, having served in the 78th Moplah Rifles. He transferred to the 113th Infantry in July 1907 when the 78th Moplah Rifles were disbanded. He attended the Staff College, Camberley from 1908 to 1910, and served as a General Staff Officer (GSO) Grade 3, in India from 1910 to 1912. He served in the War Office from 1912 to 1914 (GSO 2nd Grade), and was promoted to Major in 1913, by then having transferred to the 7th Gurkha Rifles. Vaughan married Emilie Kate Desmond Deane on 16 April 1913.

First World War

Vaughan was on active service as a staff officer from 1914 to 1918, and was mentioned in despatches nine times. He was GSO Grade 2 in 1914, and GSO Grade 1 in 1915. Following this was a series of temporary (brevet) appointments, including temporary Brigadier-General in 1916, and temporary Major-General in 1917. He was chief of staff to General Sir Julian Byng, commander of the Third Army from May 1917 until the end of the war, and was made a permanent Major-General in 1919.

His brother, Percy Cecil Vaughan, who was a London solicitor pre-war, was killed at Ypres in September 1917.

In his 1920 book The Realities of War, the British war correspondent Sir Philip Gibbs described Vaughan as: "That charming man, with his professional manner, sweetness of speech, gentleness of voice and gesture, like an Oxford Don analysing the war correspondence of Xenophon."

Vaughan was nicknamed 'Father' by the troops that served under him. John Bourne, of the University of Birmingham's Centre for First World War Studies, who has researched the nicknames given to British Army generals in the Great War, attributes to this nickname a priestly meaning, rather than any patriarchal meaning.

Vaughan appears in the famous photograph taken on the steps of the Mairie (town hall) in Cambrai on 11 November 1918. This photograph showed Haig, his Army commanders and their chiefs of staff. Vaughan is fifth from the left in the back row.

Post-war career
After the Great War, Vaughan served in the Third Anglo-Afghan War from July to September 1919, commanding the fourth of the eight war divisions that were deployed. He was mentioned in despatches and received a campaign medal and clasp.

He was then Commandant of Quetta Staff College in Quetta, India, from 1919 to 1923. Following that, he was General Officer Commanding (GOC) of two command areas in India: the Central Provinces and Berar District (1923 to 1924), and Rawalpindi District (1925 to 1926). He was made Lieutenant-General in 1926, and retired in 1928.

In August 1930, Vaughan was the representative of General Byng (now Viscount Byng of Vimy) at the unveiling of the Cambrai Memorial.

Vaughan died in 1942 at his home in Broadmead, Folkestone, at the age of 67.

Decorations and honours
1915 – Distinguished Service Order (DSO)
1918 – Companion of the Order of the Bath (CB)
1922 – Knight Commander of the Order of the British Empire (KBE)
1928 – Knight Commander of the Order of the Bath (KCB, Military Division)
Croix de Guerre
Legion d'Honneur

References and notes

Further reading
Obituary from The Times, Tuesday, 8 December 1942; p. 6; Issue 49413; col E
Obituary for General Louis Ridley Vaughan, from The New York Times, Tuesday, 8 December 1942; p. 25
'Byng of Vimy: An Appreciation', Army Quarterly, LXXI (October 1935), pp. 11–16 by Lieutenant-General Sir Louis Vaughan

External links
Portraits of Sir Louis Ridley Vaughan (National Portrait Gallery)

1875 births
1942 deaths
Indian Army generals of World War I
British military personnel of the Third Anglo-Afghan War
Graduates of the Royal Military College, Sandhurst
People educated at Uppingham School
Companions of the Distinguished Service Order
Knights Commander of the Order of the British Empire
Knights Commander of the Order of the Bath
Recipients of the Croix de Guerre (France)
Graduates of the Staff College, Camberley
British Indian Army generals
British people in colonial India